Sharp Shooters is a 1928 American silent comedy film directed by John G. Blystone and starring George O'Brien, Lois Moran, and Noah Young. A print survives in the UCLA Film and Television Archive. Sharp Shooters contains uncredited performances by Boris Karloff and Randolph Scott in his first film appearance.

Plot
George is a sailor and smooth-talking lady's man who believes in the adage "love 'em and leave 'em" when it comes to women. While on leave in Morocco, George meets Lorette, a fiery French dancing girl who falls madly in love with him, unaware that he has a girl in every port. Initially thinking of her as just another diversion, George soon discovers that he can't get rid of the girl. She follows him to the United States; he does his best to avoid her. Amused by George's predicament and feeling sorry for the girl, his two best friends, Tom and Jerry shanghai him aboard a vessel and arrange things so that George is unable to avoid Lorette. As a result, George surrenders to the inevitable and marries her.

Cast
 George O'Brien as George
 Lois Moran as Lorette
 Noah Young as Tom
 Tom Dugan as Jerry
 William Demarest as "Hi Jack" Murdock
 Gwen Lee as Flossy
 Josef Swickard as Grandpère
 Richard Cramer as Cafe Mug (uncredited)
 Boris Karloff as Cafe Proprietor (uncredited)
 Randolph Scott as Foreign Serviceman in Moroccan Cafe (uncredited)
 Harry Tenbrook as Hood (uncredited)

See also
 Boris Karloff filmography
 Randolph Scott filmography

References

External links
 
 
 

1928 films
1928 comedy films
Fox Film films
American silent feature films
American black-and-white films
Films directed by John G. Blystone
Silent American comedy films
1920s American films